Room to Grow is a Canadian home improvement television show starring Amanda Eaton and Carson Arthur. The series airs in Canada on Prime, at 11 p.m. EST Mondays. Some stations in Canada's Global network also air the program in a daytime slot on weekdays.

The series focuses primarily on outdoor landscaping improvements, such as in backyard and garden spaces.

External links
 Carson Arthur

2000s Canadian reality television series
2004 Canadian television series debuts
Television series by Corus Entertainment
Global Television Network original programming